Cold coffee may refer to:

 An undesirable form of hot coffee after it loses heat
 Iced coffee, a cold drink along the lines of iced tea
 Cold brew coffee, a specific method of brewing without heat, also served cold